Emi Hirai (born October 14, 1986) is a Japanese former ice dancer. With skating partner Marien de la Asuncion, she is a four-time Japanese national silver medalist and has competed at four Four Continents Championships.

Personal life 
Hirai was born on October 14, 1986, in Kurashiki, Okayama, Japan. She is a graduate of Kansai University.

Career 
Hirai began skating in 1995. Following a partnership with Ayato Yuzawa in the 2008–09 season, she competed with Taiyo Mizutani in 2009–10 and 2010–11.

Hirai teamed up with French ice dancer Marien de la Asuncion in 2011. They took the silver medal at the 2011–12 Japan Championships. Making their international debut, they placed 14th at the 2012 Nebelhorn Trophy and 11th at the 2013 Four Continents Championships.

Hirai and de la Asuncion have appeared at two Grand Prix events, placing 8th at the 2014 NHK Trophy and 2015 NHK Trophy.

Hirai and de la Asuncion announced their retirement on May 8, 2017, on de la Asuncion's Twitter page.

Programs 
With de la Asuncion

Competitive highlights 
GP: Grand Prix; CS: Challenger Series; JGP: Junior Grand Prix

With de la Asuncion

With Yuzawa and Mizutani

Ladies' Singles

References

External links 
 

1986 births
Japanese female ice dancers
Living people
People from Kurashiki
Kansai University alumni
Competitors at the 2009 Winter Universiade